Paroriaethus multispinis is a species of beetle in the family Cerambycidae, and the only species in the genus Paroriaethus. It was described by Stephan von Breuning in 1936.

References

Morimopsini
Beetles described in 1936